Myisha Mohd Khairul (born 27 July 2002) is a Malaysian badminton player. She was among the players in the Malaysian team who helped bring home a bronze medal at the 2022 Badminton Asia Team Championships.

Personal life 
She has two other siblings and spent most of her life in her hometown, Johor Bahru. Her parents initially wanted her to become a ballerina at a young age. She tried to pursue a career in taekwondo but she did not enjoy the sport because it was too rough. At the age of 9, she took up badminton after accompanying her brother to his first badminton class.

Achievements

BWF International Series (1 title) 
Women singles

  BWF International Challenge tournament
  BWF International Series tournament
  BWF Future Series tournament

References

External links 
 

2002 births
Living people
People from Johor
Malaysian female badminton players
21st-century Malaysian women